The one thousand-dollar note is the highest-valued banknote in circulation in Hong Kong. Currently, this note is issued by the Hongkong and Shanghai Banking Corporation (HSBC), Standard Chartered Hong Kong, and the Bank of China. Due to its gold-colored theme, this note was nicknamed “Gold Cow (Chinese: 金牛)” by the locals, derived from the term “Big Cow (Chinese: 大牛)” that is used for the city's five hundred-dollar note. If counted according to the notes’ serial number, it is the note with the second-lowest printing figure, higher than that of the fifty-dollar note.

History
Proof issues were made by the Oriental Bank Corporation and the Bank of Hindustan, China and Japan during the 1860s. However, due to the low price level in that era, those notes are currently extremely rare.

It was not until 31 March 1977 that the first circulating note was issued by the HSBC with a dimension of 100mm by 173mm. Later on 6 March 1979, the Standard Chartered Bank (Hong Kong) issued its own one thousand-dollar note, with a dimension of 100mm by 170mm.

Since 1985, the note issued by both banks were redesigned with a shrunk size of 81.5mm by 163mm. In 1988, a lighter shade of gold was used by the HSBC as the previous selection of colour was overly dark. The same change could also be seen on the twenty-dollar note and the one hundred-dollar note of HSBC during this decade.

As the date of the transfer of sovereignty over Hong Kong was approaching, the two note-issuing banks modified their design in 1993 to tune down the British elements. In 1994, the Bank of China became the third note-issuing bank in the territory.

Changes of design were made in the year 2003, 2010 and subsequently in 2018 to add in new security features.

Nickname of the notes
Other than the aforementioned nickname of “Gold Cow (Chinese: 金牛)” as a general reference to this particular denomination, other nicknames were also adopted by the locals and especially the numismatic community in Hong Kong. Some issues, especially those issued by the Bank of China, may not have a common nickname due to its relatively short history.

Notes issued by the Hongkong and Shanghai Banking Corporation
 1977-1983 Big Golden Lion
 1985-1987 Goldfish yellow
 1988-1991 Salted Egg Yolk
 1993-2002 Side-face Lion
 2003-2009 Front-face Lion
Notes issued by the Standard Chartered Bank (Hong Kong)
 1979-1982 Big Golden Dragon
 1985-1992 Long-stick Dragon
 1993-2002 Short-stick Dragon

References

Boon, K. N. 2017, Hong Kong & Macau Numismatic Reference 1846–2017 (2nd ed.). Trigonometric Sdn Bhd & International Numismatic Foundation. 
Ma Tak Wo 2004, Illustrated Catalogue of Hong Kong Currency, Ma Tak Wo Numismatic Co., LTD Kowloon Hong Kong. 

Banknotes of Hong Kong
One-thousand-base-unit banknotes